is a Japanese football player. He plays for Verspah Oita.

His profile was raised when he scored an overhead kick from a tight angle (on the volley) while playing against Al-Ittihad in the AFC Champions League semi-final second round. His third daughter, Riina Sugimoto joined the idol group SKE48 as the 11th Generation.

Club statistics

References

External links

1982 births
Living people
Ryutsu Keizai University alumni
Association football people from Ibaraki Prefecture
Japanese footballers
J1 League players
J2 League players
Japan Football League players
Keita Sugimoto
Nagoya Grampus players
Tokushima Vortis players
Verspah Oita players
Keita Sugimoto
Japanese expatriate footballers
Expatriate footballers in Thailand
Japanese expatriate sportspeople in Thailand
Association football forwards